Philippe Leroy may refer to:

Philippe Leroy (actor)
Philippe Leroy (politician)